The American Terracotta Tile and Ceramic Company was founded in 1881; originally as Spring Valley Tile Works; in Terra Cotta, Illinois, between Crystal Lake, Illinois and McHenry, Illinois near Chicago by William Day Gates. It became the country's first manufactury of architectural terracotta in 1889. The production consisted of drain tile, brick, chimney tops, finials, urns, and other economically fireproof building materials. Gates used the facilities to experiment with clays and glazes in an effort to design a line of art pottery which led to the introduction of Teco (pronounced  TĒĒ - CŌ ) Pottery.  American Terra Cotta's records are housed at the University of Minnesota and include original architectural drawings.

The smooth, micro-crystalline, matte "Teco Green" glaze of Teco art pottery was developed independently and wasn't an attempt to copy the famous Grueby green.

Wares
The pottery shapes derived from line and color rather than elaborate decoration.  While most of the 500 shapes created by 1911 were the product of Gates' efforts, many of the remaining Teco designs were the work of several Chicago architects that were involved in the Prairie School style as expressed by Frank Lloyd Wright. They had rejected the revival styles of American architecture of the 19th century in favor of using wood, stone and clay in simplicity of design. Any ornamentation consisted of geometrical or natural objects which merged gracefully with the form. Teco Pottery became closely linked with this style and the pottery was often an integral part of Prairie School homes Bungalow.

Gates retired in 1913 to write for Clay-worker magazine, but returned in 1915.  His son Major Gates, a ceramic engineer, invented a pressing machine and tunnel kiln, and also a glaze spraying apparatus called a pulischrometer.  In 1918, they acquired Indianapolis Terra Cotta Company.  In 1919, a Minneapolis branch opened.

Nearing the end of his life, William D. Gates constructed a residence just north of Crystal Lake, Illinois named "Trail's End" symbolizing his decreasing involvement in the company.

After the Crash
In October 1929, the Indianapolis branch closed due to the stock market crash.  Later, the plant also fell victim to the Great Depression and operations ceased.  In 1930, ownership was transferred to George A. Berry, Jr; Gates' attorney. Terra cotta production resumed until 1941.  After World War II, they resumed manufacturing structural clay products through 1966.  In 1972, TC inc. was formed from a merger of three businesses as production facility of ground engaging tools for construction equipment on the site.

Sterling mark 

The following is taken directly from an early catalog :

References

Further reading

External links 

The Teco Art Pottery Collection Modern day reproduction Teco Pottery
Teco Pottery Marks
Teco Pottery History
Teco Pottery Examples
Teco Pottery

American art pottery